Francisco González Guinán (3 October 1841 – 7 December 1932), was a Venezuelan politician, journalist, lawyer, prominent historian of the 19th century in his country, and one of the main supporters of Antonio Guzmán Blanco.

Biography
Francisco González Guinán was born on 3 October 1841 in Valencia, Venezuela. He was a historian, journalist, and lawyer.

He was the Minister of Development of Venezuela from 1879 until 1880 under Antonio Guzmán Blanco.

Under provisional president Juan Vicente Gómez, he was the 139th Minister of Foreign Affairs of Venezuela from 19 December 1908 until 13 August 1909.

He died on 7 December 1932 in Macuto, Venezuela.

See also 
List of Venezuelan writers 
List of Ministers of Foreign Affairs of Venezuela
Venezuelan literature
History of Venezuela

References 
 Francisco González Guinán — Venezuelatuya.com.
 Francisco González Guinán — Venezuela Online.

External links
 

  

 

1841 births
1932 deaths
Venezuelan Ministers of Foreign Affairs
Members of the Senate of Venezuela
19th-century Venezuelan lawyers
Venezuelan journalists
19th-century Venezuelan historians
Central University of Venezuela alumni
People from Valencia, Venezuela